Giorgos Bantis (born 30 April 1985) is a Greek former professional footballer who played as a goalkeeper.

Career
Bantis started his career in the academies of the football team of his hometown Akanthos F.C. Ierissos Chalkidiki. In 2001, he joined the football academy of Iraklis Thessaloniki and from the 2005–06 season he belongs to the professional squad. In the summer of 2011, he signed with Asteras Tripoli a three years' contract. On 20 May 2014 he renewed his contract for two more years.
In November 2016 he moved to Omonia.

Honours
Asteras Tripolis
Greek Cup runner-up: 2012–13

References

1985 births
Living people
Greek footballers
Iraklis Thessaloniki F.C. players
Asteras Tripolis F.C. players
AC Omonia players
Panionios F.C. players
PAS Lamia 1964 players
Super League Greece players
Association football goalkeepers

People from Stagira-Akanthos

Footballers from Central Macedonia